Muhammed Hamdullah Sayeed (born 11 April 1982, Mysore) is an Indian politician. He is a leader of the Indian National Congress party. He was elected to the 15th Lok Sabha from Lakshadweep in 2009.

Early life
Muhammed Hamdullah Sayeed was born in Mysore to former Congress leader P.M. Sayeed and Rahmath Sayeed.

Political career
Muhammed Hamdullah Sayeed was elected to the 15th Lok Sabha at the age of 26, He was the youngest MP in the 15th Lok Sabha.

References

Indian National Congress politicians from Lakshadweep
Indian Muslims
Malayali politicians
India MPs 2009–2014
People from Lakshadweep district
1982 births
Living people
Lok Sabha members from Lakshadweep
United Progressive Alliance candidates in the 2014 Indian general election